The Nancy Point Formation is a geologic formation in Panama. It preserves fossils dating back to the Miocene period.

Fossil content 
 Admetula valientensis
 Cancellaria pilula
 Diaphus apalus, D. depressifrons, D. multiserratus
 Lobianchia johnfitchi
 Massyla corpulenta

See also 
 List of fossiliferous stratigraphic units in Panama

References

Bibliography 
 
 

Geologic formations of Panama
Neogene Panama
Messinian
Paleontology in Panama
Siltstone formations
Sandstone formations
Open marine deposits
Shallow marine deposits
Formations